A potty chair, or simply a potty, is a proportionately small chair or enclosure with an opening for seating very young children to "go potty." It is a variant of the close stool which was used by adults before the widespread adoption of water flushed toilets. There are a variety of designs, some placed directly over the toilet called "Toilet Training Seats" so the egested fecal material drops directly into the toilet bowl thereby eliminating manual removal and disposal of the said waste from a receptacle beneath the hole which is often a bag or receptacle similar to a chamber pot. Potty chairs are used during potty training, a.k.a. toilet training. These are very useful for young babies.

Usage of the potty chair greatly varies across cultures.

References

Toilet training